A mash-up novel (also called "mashup" or "mashed-up novel") is an unauthorised non-canonical (and not even in-universe) work of fiction (often parody) which combines a pre-existing literature text, often a classic work of fiction, with another genre, usually horror genre, into a single narrative.

Characteristics 

Marjorie Kehe of the Christian Science Monitor renders this admixture of classic text as "somewhere between 60 and 85 percent original text, with new plot twists added by contemporary co-authors". These "twists" often include horror fiction elements like vampires, werewolves or zombies.

History 

The term mashup or mash-up originated within the music industry. Also called "mash-up", songs within the genre are described as a song or composition created by blending two or more pre-recorded songs, usually by overlaying the vocal track of one song seamlessly over the instrumental track of another. To the extent that such works are "transformative" of original content, they may find protection from copyright claims under the "fair use" doctrine of copyright law. Adam Cohen of the New York Times notes that even before that, "the idea of combining two data sources into a new product began in the tech world" before spreading to other media, including book publishing.

The term appears to have first been coined in a review of Seth Grahame-Smith's 2009 novel Pride and Prejudice and Zombies. Initially calling it a "parody" and "literary hybrid", Caroline Kellogg, lead blogger for Jacket Copy, The LA Times book blog, later describes the work as "novel-as-mashup". As the popularity of the novel grew and a bidding war commenced over the film rights to the book, the term spread. Subsequent mash-up novels include Sense and Sensibility and Sea Monsters, Little Women and Werewolves and Abraham Lincoln, Vampire Hunter (also by Grahame-Smith), the last of which was adapted into a film of the same name.

Prior to publication, the artwork cover for Pride and Prejudice and Zombies depicting a "zombified" Regency portrait of Marcia Fox by Sir William Beechey altered by Quirk Books artist Eric "Doogie" Horner to show her lower face eroded, exposing bone and viscera caught the attention of bloggers, as did the opening line of the novel: "It is a truth universally acknowledged that a zombie in possession of brains must be in want of more brains." This is a parody of Austen's original line, "It is a truth universally acknowledged that a single man, in possession of a good fortune, must be in want of a wife."

As a genre 
While most works in mash-up genre rely on fictional texts as their basis, other works like Abraham Lincoln, Vampire Hunter superimpose the same sort of contrasting genre upon historical figures and events. A more recent phenomenon within the genre is the combination of more than two original works, or genres, as in the case of Robinson Crusoe (The Eerie Adventures of the Lycanthrope), which combines the original novel with elements borrowed from the works of H. P. Lovecraft as well as the popular genre of werewolf fiction, and is accordingly attributed to three authors – Daniel Defoe, H. P. Lovecraft and Peter Clines.

Exemplars 
As previously noted, the novel Pride and Prejudice and Zombies combines Jane Austen's classic 1813 novel Pride and Prejudice with elements of modern zombie fiction, crediting Austen as co-author. It was first published in April 2009 by Quirk Books and in October 2009 a Deluxe Edition was released, containing full-color images and additional zombie scenes.

An earlier novel, Move Under Ground by Nick Mamatas, was a 2004 novel combining the Beat style of Jack Kerouac with the cosmic horror of H. P. Lovecraft's Cthulhu Mythos.

Copyright issues 
Mashup novels constitute derivative works since they include major elements borrowed from an original, previously created work. Most authors of such novels, however, avoid potential legal issues (and the payment of royalties to the original writers) by basing their books on texts that are in the public domain.

Reception 
While initially well-received (Pride and Prejudice and Zombies spent eight months on the New York Times Best Seller list and Abraham Lincoln: Vampire Hunter has already been made into a feature film), at least one reviewer has suggested that the genre has run its course in popularity. Jennifer Schuessler, of The New York Times reflects the pessimism of critics of the genre:

Examples

Abraham Lincoln, Vampire Hunter
Android Karenina
Move Under Ground
Pride and Prejudice and Zombies
Pride and Prejudice and Zombies: Dawn of the Dreadfuls
Queen Victoria: Demon Hunter
The Secret Diary of Desmond Pfeiffer
Sense and Sensibility and Sea Monsters
The Great Gatsby and the Zombies

See also
Copyright protection for fictional characters
Continuation novel
Cross-licensing
Crossover (fiction) – authorised, sometimes canonical, mixing of characters or worlds from originally separate fictional universes for new story.
Intercompany crossover in comics.
Klinger v. Conan Doyle Estate, Ltd.
Parallel novel – non-canonical expansions within the fictional universe.
Pastiche
The Adventures of Tintin: Breaking Free
The Lunar Chronicles

References

External links
 Quirk Classics website – imprint of Quirk Books dedicated to Mashups.
 Sussex Chainsaw Massacre: The horrification of Jane Austen – overview of genre and review of Sense and Sensibility and Sea Monsters, New York Magazine, 6 September 2009.
 Pride And Prejudice And Zombies Spin-Offs Are Out Of Control! 11 Classic Monster Mashups – The Huffington Post, 28 April 2010.

 

-
Unofficial adaptations
Mashup
2000s fads and trends